Art Deco Detective is a 1994 film directed by Philippe Mora.  In the film, while investigating the murder of a movie star, a detective finds that he himself is being set up for the crime.  The detective's full name is Arthur Decowitz, but he is known to all as "Art Deco" - hence the title.

Premise
While investigating the murder of a movie star, a detective finds that he himself is being set up for the crime.

Cast
 John Dennis Johnston as Detective Arthur Decowitz
 Jonathan Ball as Bip Marceau
 Sonia Nassery Cole as Irina Bordat
 Brion James as Jim Wexler
 Maxine John-James as Lana Torrido
 Stephen McHattie as "Hyena"
 Dina Morrone as Sofia
 Rena Riffel as Julie / Meg Hudson
 Joe Santos as Detective Guy Lean
 Eddi Wilde as Sergei
 Heinrich James as German Terrorist
 Jim Chiros as Masked Terrorist 
 Biff Manard as Stocking Terrorist
 Mel Smith as Porno Movie Director
 Brad Wilson as Rout Vikking

External links
 

1994 films
1994 comedy films
American comedy films
Films directed by Philippe Mora
1990s English-language films
1990s American films